Nové Hony is a village and municipality in Lučenec District in the Banská Bystrica Region of central Slovakia.

History
In historical records the village was first mentioned in 1332.

Geography
The municipality lies at an altitude of 203 metres and covers an area of 16.648 km². It has a population of about 195 people.

External links
 
 
http://www.statistics.sk/mosmis/eng/run.html

Villages and municipalities in Lučenec District